The New Logus Block is a building complex in southeast Portland, Oregon, listed on the National Register of Historic Places.

See also
 National Register of Historic Places listings in Southeast Portland, Oregon

References

Further reading

External links
 

1892 establishments in Oregon
Buckman, Portland, Oregon
Commercial buildings completed in 1892
Commercial buildings on the National Register of Historic Places in Oregon
Individually listed contributing properties to historic districts on the National Register in Oregon
National Register of Historic Places in Portland, Oregon
Portland Historic Landmarks
Richardsonian Romanesque architecture in Oregon